Januarius Jingwa (JJ) Asongu is an American philosopher, scholar, journalist, author, entrepreneur, and activist. Born in the small city of Lewoh, in the former British Southern Cameroons, Africa, he moved to the United States in the mid-1990s, where he is now a naturalized citizen.

In the United States, he continued as a human rights and political activist, while also engaged in academics. His academic career culminated when he became a professor of business and in 2012 he founded an American-style international university in Cameroon called Saint Monica University (SMU). With headquarters in the United States, SMU now has campuses in Cameroon and upcoming campuses in Cambodia, Equatorial Guinea and Nigeria.

Birth and early life
Januarius Asongu was born into a middle-class family in West Cameroon (former British Cameroons) in 1970 as the first of seven children (four female and three male). His parents, Nicholas Jingwa and Monique Nkengbeza, were devout Catholic Christians.  He became a leader of the Young Christian Students (YCS) in Kumbo Diocese, while in secondary and high school.

Education
Asongu went to secondary and high school at Government High School Kumbo (now Government Bilingual High School Kumbo) from 1982 to 1989. He then began his priestly formation at Bishop Rogan College, Soppo, Buea. His university education began at St. Thomas Aquinas Major Seminary, Bambui, an affiliated institute of the Pontifical Urbanian University, Rome, where he earned a Bachelor of Philosophy degree.  After leaving the seminary, he embarked on an academic career abroad in the tradition of his mentor, the late Professor Bernard Fonlon,  also an ex-seminarian and the first person from the Cameroons to earn a PhD. Asonge earned a certificate in journalism from  the University of Lagos, Nigeria S(1995) and then a PhD in journalism in 1998 in the United States .    He was the first  person from the Cameroons to be awarded the Press Fellowship at Wolfson College, University of Cambridge by the Nuffield Foundation in the United Kingdom. In 2012, he earned a Master of Science degree in management of information technology from the University of Maryland University College, and in 2011 a PhD in business administration from Charisma University.

Brief work history
Asongu's first job was that of a teacher of English literature, history, and commerce at Bishop Rogan College, Buea (1989/90). In 1993/94, he worked as a seminarian on internship at St. John's Catholic Parish, Kumba, and St. Luke's Parish, Nyandong. After his journalism training, he worked as a reporter in the Cameroons, where he wrote for various newspapers and co-hosted Catholic programs on CRTV. His writings brought him into conflict with the administration and in 1997 he left the country for the United States. His first occupation in the US was journalism, where he worked at The Houston Chronicle as an Alfred Friendly Press Fellow. He was the first from the Cameroons to earn this fellowship from the Alfred Friendly Foundation He was awarded the Press Fellowship at Wolfson College, Cambridge. Upon his return to the US from the UK, he worked as reporter and editor for various newspapers and magazines and taught briefly at several high schools.  In 1999, he transitioned into public relations where he worked for various agencies and international companies. Asongu has taught at a number of universities in the United States including Rockford University, Rockford, IL; Herzing University, Milwaukee, WI; Fort Hays State University, Hays, KS; Embry-Riddle Aeronautical University, Rockford Campus; Franklin University, Columbus, OH. He has also started a number of small businesses in the United States and the Cameroons.

Public scholarship and activism
Asongu has spoken on controversial issues on many radio and TV stations in the Cameroons, and has written op-eds for American newspapers. He conducted a detailed study of the Anglophone problem (Cameroon), and wrote a thesis in 1993 on "The Problem of National Unity in Cameroon: A Politico-Philosophical Analysis." He was also a champion of Southern Cameroons independence for years before resigning from the leadership of the struggle in 2006. He has written on corporate social responsibility including "Innovation as an Argument for Corporate Social Responsibility, " and "Strategic Corporate Social Responsibility in Practice.

Founding of Saint Monica University
Asongu founded Saint Monica University (SMU), first as Professional Training Center (PTC), in 2009. PTC is now called Saint Monica Vocational Training Center and is located in Buea. In 2012, he incorporated SMU in the United States, but most of SMU's operations are in the Cameroons, where it operates ground campuses in the college-town of Buea (Saint Monica University Institute) as well as the commercial hub of Kumba (Institute of Professional Studies).

Boards
He has served on the boards of the National Association of African-American Studies (NAAAS) and Affiliates, and the Environment and Rural Development Foundation (ERUDEF).

Books

 Strategic Corporate Social Responsibility in Practice. Lawrenceville, GA: Greenview Publishing Company, 2007, 
 Doing Business Abroad: A Handbook for Expatriates, (Co-authored with C'Lamt Ho and Marvee Marr). Lawrenceville, GA: Greenview Publishing Company, 2007, 
 The Iraq Quagmire: The Price of Imperial Arrogance, (Co-authored with Stephen Lendman). Lawrenceville, GA: Greenview Publishing Company, 2007, 
 War, Politics And Business: A Critique Of The Global War On Terror. American Star Books, Frederick, Maryland, 2007, 
 Technology in Education and Business: Myths, Issues, Ethics, and Money. Lawrenceville, GA: Greenview Publishing Company, 2007. Retrieved March 4, 2017, from https://books.google.com/books?isbn=0979797624

References

1970 births
Living people
Philosophers from Ohio
Philosophers from Illinois
Philosophers from Kansas
Educational administrators
Heads of universities in Cameroon
Fellows of Wolfson College, Cambridge
University of Maryland Global Campus alumni
Franklin University faculty
Fort Hays State University
Rockford University faculty
Southern Cameroons
British Cameroon
Cameroonian emigrants to the United States